Home from Home can refer to:

 Home from Home (album), by Millencolin
 Home from Home (1939 film), a 1939 British film
 Home from Home (2013 film), a 2013 German film
 Home from Home (TV series), a 2001 Channel 4 series
 Home from Home (TV series), a 2016 BBC sitcom